This is a list of fictional primates in animation, and is a subsidiary to the list of fictional primates. Non-tailed primates such as chimpanzees, gorillas and orangutans are included in the apes section. Tailed primates such as monkeys, baboons, aye-ayes and marmosets are included in the Monkeys section. This list does not include humans, prehistoric human related species and humanoids.

Apes

Monkeys

Prosimians

References

Animation
Primates